Borne may refer to:

Places
 Borne, Ardèche, a commune in the Ardèche department, France
 Borne, Haute-Loire, a commune in the Haute-Loire department, France
 Borne, Saxony-Anhalt, a municipality in Saxony-Anhalt, Germany
 Borne, North Brabant, a hamlet turned neighborhood in North Brabant, Netherlands
 Borne, Overijssel, a town in Overijssel, Netherlands
 Borne, Drawsko County in West Pomeranian Voivodeship, Poland
 Borne, Gmina Chojnice in Pomeranian Voivodeship, Poland
 Borne, Gmina Konarzyny in Pomeranian Voivodeship, Poland
 Borne, Myślibórz County in West Pomeranian Voivodeship, Poland

People with the surname
 Alain Borne (1915–1962), 20th-century French poet and lawyer
 Daisy Theresa Borne (1906–1998), British sculptor
 Élisabeth Borne (born 1961), French politician
 Étienne Borne (1907–1993), professor
 François Borne (1840–1920), French flautist and composer
 Guillaume Borne (born 1988), French footballer
 Hal Borne (1911–2000), American song composer, orchestra leader, music arranger, and musical director
 Lucien-Hubert Borne (1884–1954), Canadian politician
 Ludwig Börne (1786–1837), German political writer and satirist
 Michel Borne (1784–1???), merchant and political figure
 Tony Borne (1926–2010), American professional wrestler
 Vanessa Borne (born 1988), American professional wrestler and actress

Other uses
 Borne (band), an Australian alt-rock band
 Borne (novel), by Jeff VanderMeer
 -borne, a UK place name suffix, using a form of Bourne
 A "borne", a waymarker on Liberty Road (La Voie de la Liberté) in northern France

See also
 Born (disambiguation)
 Born (surname)
 Bourne (disambiguation)
 Bourne (surname)
 

English-language surnames
French-language surnames